Le Fau is a commune in the Cantal department in Auvergne, south-central France.

It is a small community built around winter sports and tourism. It has a campsite at the Domaine Lissart de Miège.

Population

See also
Communes of the Cantal department

References

Communes of Cantal